Butlocks Heath is a village in the district of Eastleigh in Hampshire, England. The village lies approximately 3.4 miles (5.4 km) south-east from Southampton. It is in the civil parish of Hound, which also includes Netley. Butlocks Heath and Netley are now very close, because of housing growth, though a small area of woodland called The Bunney separates the two villages.

Butlocks Heath is less than a mile outside the city limits of Southampton, and located in the nearby Eastleigh (borough). Woolston Road forms the backbone of the village with roads spurring off it.

References

Borough of Eastleigh
Villages in Hampshire